Barbara E. Moo is an American computer scientist known for co-authoring several books on C++, working on an early product written in C++, and directing AT&T's WorldNet AT&T's Internet services business.

Biography
Moo worked at AT&T for 15 years, working on one of the first commercial products using C++. While at AT&T, she worked closely with C++ inventor Bjarne Stroustrup and managed the C++ development team for several years."Author Profile: Barbara Moo", InformIT. She directed the development of AT&T's WorldNet Internet service business.

Bibliography
 Moo, Barbara; E. Josée Lajoie; Stanley B. Lippman, "C++ Primer", 2012. 
 Moo, Barbara; Koenig, Andrew, Accelerated C++: Practical Programming by Example, Addison-Wesley, 2000. 
 Moo, Barbara; Koenig, Andrew, Ruminations on C++: A Decade of Programming Insight and Experience, Addison-Wesley, 1997.

Interview
 "Learning Modern C++: An Interview with Barbara Moo", interview with Jeff Martin on February 11, 2013, infoq.com.

Quotes
 "Abstraction is selective ignorance" —Barbara E. Moo, Andrew R. Koenig in  Accelerated C++: Practical Programming by Example, Addison-Wesley, 2000.  (and quoted in Hayles, N. Katherine, My Mother Was a Computer: Digital Subjects and Literary Texts, University of Chicago Press, 2005. Cf. p.58)

References

American women computer scientists
American computer scientists
Living people
American technology writers
American computer programmers
AT&T people
Year of birth missing (living people)
Place of birth missing (living people)
21st-century American women